Idrettsforeningen Trauma is a Norwegian sports club from Tromøya. It has sections for association football, team handball, orienteering and skiing.

The men's football team currently plays in the Third Division, the fourth tier of Norwegian football. Head coach is Morten Knutsen.

External links

 Official site 

Football clubs in Norway
Sport in Aust-Agder
Arendal